Clement Annie Okonkwo (born 23 May 1960) was elected Senator for the Anambra Central constituency of Anambra State, Nigeria, taking office on 29 May 2007. He is a member of the People's Democratic Party (PDP).

Okonkwo was born on 23 May 1960 in Ojoto, near Onitsha in Anambra State.
He obtained an Advanced Diploma in Management, Harvard University, USA (1997–1998), Advanced Diploma in Commercial Law and Practice, University of Lagos (1995–1997) and Advanced Diploma in Marketing, University of Lagos (1994–1995).
Entering business, he built a conglomerate employing over 7,000 people that includes firms such as Reliance Telecomm, Clemco Industries, Modern Communications  (satellite TV Network), MacClemm Marketing Communications, Sunflower Nigeria and Pentagon Oil.

After taking his seat in the Senate, he was appointed to committees on Upstream Petroleum Resources, Police Affairs, Environment (vice-chairman) and Agriculture.
In a mid-term evaluation of Senators in May 2009, ThisDay noted that he had sponsored a bill for the Federal Government to make  essential commodities accessible and affordable to Nigerians, and a bill to establish the Nigerians Citizens in Diaspora Commission.
He was a contender in the February 2010 elections for Anambra State Governor.
However, he lost to the incumbent, Peter Obi, who was reelected.

References

Living people
1960 births
People from Anambra State
Peoples Democratic Party members of the Senate (Nigeria)
All Progressives Congress politicians
Harvard University alumni
University of Lagos alumni
People from Onitsha
21st-century Nigerian politicians